Press for Time is a 1966 British comedy film starring Norman Wisdom. The screenplay was written by Eddie Leslie and Norman Wisdom, based on the 1963 novel Yea Yea Yea, by Angus McGill. It was partly filmed in Teignmouth in Devon. It was the last film Wisdom made for the Rank Organisation.

Plot 
Norman Shields (Norman Wisdom) is a newspaper seller in London, a job organised for him by his grandfather, the Prime Minister (also played by Wisdom). After causing chaos. he is found a new job as reporter on a newspaper in the fictional seaside town of Tinmouth (partly filmed in the real seaside town of Teignmouth). The newspaper owner, an MP, has ambitions to become a junior minister and so goes along with the Prime Minister's 'request'.

During his time in Tinmouth, the well-meaning Norman gets himself into all sorts of trouble whilst reporting, such as starting an argument at a council meeting which develops into an all-out fight between members. He later becomes the reporter for the entertainment section of the newspaper, covering a beauty contest which his girlfriend Liz wins. They later return to London together, leaving a more politically settled Tinmouth behind.

Cast 
Norman Wisdom as Norman Shields/ Emily, his mother/ Wilfred, his grandfather (the P.M.)
Derek Bond as Major R.E. Bartlett
Derek Francis as Alderman Corcoran
Angela Browne as Eleanor Lampton
Tracey Crisp as Ruby Fairchild
Allan Cuthbertson as Mr. Ballard (Attorney General)
Noel Dyson as Mrs. Corcoran
Peter Jones as Robin Willoughby (photographer)
David Lodge as Mr. Ross (editor of the Tinmouth Times)
Stanley Unwin as Mr. Nottage (Town Clerk)
Frances White as Liz Corcoran
Michael Balfour as Sewerman
Tony Selby as Harry Marshall (reporter for the County Chronicle)
Michael Bilton as Councilor Hedge
Norman Pitt as Councilor Quilter
Hazel Coppen as Granny Fork
Totti Truman Taylor as Mrs. Doe Connor
Toni Gilpin as P.M.'s secretary
Gordon Rollings as Bus Conductor
Imogen Hassall as Suffragette (uncredited)
Helen Mirren as Penelope Squires (uncredited)

Reception
It was one of the twelve most popular films at the British box office in 1967.

References

External links

1966 films
1966 comedy films
British comedy films
Films directed by Robert Asher
Films set in Devon
Films set in London
1960s English-language films
1960s British films